San Gaetano, also known as Santi Michele e Gaetano, is a Baroque church in Florence, Italy, located on the Piazza Antinori, entrusted to the Institute of Christ the King Sovereign Priest.

History
A Romanesque church, dedicated solely to Saint Michael the Archangel, had been located at the site for centuries prior to its Baroque reconstruction. Patronized by the Theatine order, the new church was dedicated to Saint Cajetan, one of the founders of the order, though the church could not formally be named after him until his canonisation in 1671. Funding for this reconstruction was obtained from the noble families in Florence, including the Medicis. Cardinal Carlo de' Medici was particularly concerned with the work, and his name is inscribed on the façade. Building took place between 1604 and 1648. The original designs were by Bernardo Buontalenti but a number of architects had a hand in building it, each of whom changed the design. The most important architects were Matteo Nigetti and Gherardo Silvani.

In 2008, the church was entrusted to the Institute of Christ the King Sovereign Priest, a traditional institute of clerical life which exclusively offers Mass in Latin according to the pre-Vatican II Roman Rite, and has been the site of ordinations for the order since.

Exterior
The façade, with its sculptural decorations, is  atypical for Florentine churches, which had a predilection for geometrically ornamented façades. It has three portals: the center portal has a triangular tympanum surmounted by reclining marble statues representing Faith and Charity, sculpted by the Flemish Baldassarre Delmosel. In the center above the door is the heraldic shield of the Theatine order; higher above is the shield of Cardinal Giovanni Carlo de Medici, a prominent patron. Above the side doors are a statue of St Cajetan (right, by the same Delmosel) and St Andrew Avellino (left, by Francesco Andreozzi).

Interior
The interior is richly decorated as is customary in Baroque churches. The counterfacade has an organ by Benedetto Tronci of Pistoia. The entrance marble holy water fonts were sculpted in the form of shells supported by angels by Domenico Pieratti. Along the cornice are 14 statues depicting apostles and evangelist, sculpted by Novelli, Caccini, Baratta, Foggini, Piamontini, Pettirossi, Fortini, and Cateni. With each of these statues is a bas-relief depicting an event in the life of each saints.

The first chapel on the right houses a Martyrdom of St Andrew by Antonio Ruggeri; the ceiling was decorated by Ottavio Vannini, who painted in the spandrels aa Ecce Homo and the Calling of Peter.

The second chapel on the right houses a St Michael frees the Souls in Purgatory by Vignali, who also painted the canvases on the wall depicting the life of St Peter. The ceiling was frescoed by Michele Colonna and Agostino Metello.

The third chapel on the right has an altarpiece depicting St Cajetan and St Andrea Avellino with the Trinity and St Francis of Assisi by Matteo Rosselli. A bust of St Francis on the altar was sculpted by Malatesti. The walls have portraits of Cardinal Francesco Martelli and the archbishop Giuseppe Maria Martelli, painted by Roman artists. In a small corridor entering at the crossing are two mausoleums, one with the ashes of Agostino Coltellini, famous jurist and writer, depicted in a canvas. The other is dedicated to Lorenzo Lorenzini, a pupil of Vincenzio Viviani.

On the right crossing is a canvas depicting the Adoration of the Magi by Ottaviano Vannini.  Below is a mausoleum of the Bonsi family. In the ceiling is a fresco depicting the Theatine order by Filippo Galletti.

The fourth chapel on the right is dedicated to the Virgin. The  Nativity altarpiece was painted by Matteo Rosselli. The walls are painted by Fabbrizio Boschi, depicting the Annunciation and Visitation. Atop the altar is a bronze crucifix by Giovanni Francesco Susini.

The fifth chapel houses the main altar with a silver ciborium made by Benedetto Petrucci, and donated by the Torrigiani family.

Near the choir is a large stone tabernacle with a bronze crucifix by Francesco Susini, patronized by Prince Lorenzo de' Medici, son of Ferdinando I. The cupola is frescoed by Pietro Galletti.

The sixth chapel houses an oil painting on canvas depicting the Invention of the Cross painted by Matteo Rosselli. Two other paintings and the frescoes are by Bilibert and by Vignali.

At the end of the crossing is a canvas by Giovanni Bilibert, depicting the Exaltation of the Cross standing above the mausoleum of Cardinal Giovanni Bonsi.

The seventh chapel houses a San Andrea Avellino stuck with apoplexy at the altar by Ignazio Hugsford. The wall frescoes depict the Presentation at the Temple by Francesco and Alfonso Boschi. The ceiling was decorated by Lorenzo Lippi.

In the eighth chapel (second chapel on the left) is the Cappella Franceschi, the chapel of the Franceschi noble family of bankers and traders. The main altarpiece is a masterwork of Pietro da Cortona, depicting a Martyrdom of St Lawrence. The ceiling was decorated by Colonna and Metelli. The side canvases depict the Riches of the Church dispensed as Charity by St Lawrence by Matteo Rosselli and a St Francis by Jacopo da Empoli.

The ninth chapel has a canvas depicting the Adoration of the Immaculate Conception by Giacinto Fabbroni. The ceiling was frescoed by P. Galletti. The chapel serves as the mausoleum for Francesco and Marcellino Albergotti, both depicted in bas-reliefs.

Statues of Apostoles and Evangelists 

Left side (from the altar to the counterfacade)

Lato destro (dall'altare alla controfacciata)

References

Gaetano
Baroque architecture in Florence
Churches completed in 1648
17th-century Roman Catholic church buildings in Italy
1640s establishments in Italy
Theatine churches
Churches used by the Institute of Christ the King Sovereign Priest